Chereshkite  is a village in the municipality of Smolyan, located in the Smolyan Province of southern Bulgaria. The village is located 167.965 km from Sofia. As of 2007, the village had a population of 14 people.

References

Villages in Smolyan Province